?O, Zoo!: The Making of a Fiction Film is a 1986 experimental Canadian documentary film directed by Philip Hoffman.

Synopsis
Based in part around the making of Peter Greenaway's 1985 film A Zed & Two Noughts and constructed primarily from found footage made by his grandfather who onced worked as a newsreel cameraman, the film interrogates the distinction between fiction and documentary filmmaking through various meditations on the narrative assumptions and inventions that people attach to the neutrality of visual images; its most noted scene narrates the death of an elephant, without ever actually showing the animal.

Reception
The film premiered at the 1986 Festival of Festivals. It received a Genie Award nomination for Best Feature Length Documentary at the 8th Genie Awards.

It is also his most successful film to date.

See also
Postmodernist film

References

External links
 
 Official website

1986 films
1986 documentary films
Canadian short documentary films
Collage film
Canadian avant-garde and experimental short films
English-language Canadian films
1980s English-language films
1980s Canadian films